Druzhinino is a rural locality (a village) in Azletskoye Rural Settlement, Kharovsky District, Vologda Oblast, Russia. The population was 10 as of 2002.

Geography 
Druzhinino is located 65 km northwest of Kharovsk (the district's administrative centre) by road. Gridinskaya is the nearest rural locality.

References 

Rural localities in Kharovsky District